Domenico Capello (1888 – 1950) was an Italian professional footballer who played as a midfielder.

He played in the first ever game of the Italy national football team on 15 May 1910 against France.

External links
 

1888 births
1950 deaths
Italian footballers
Italy international footballers
Serie A players
Torino F.C. players
Juventus F.C. players
Association football midfielders